El Campo may refer to:
 El Campo, California
 El Campo, Texas
El Campo, Palencia